The Kigoma–Butare–Ngozi–Gitega High Voltage Power Line, also Rwanda–Burundi High Voltage Power Line is a high voltage electricity power line, under construction, connecting the high voltage substation at Kigoma in Rwanda to another high voltage substation at Gitega in Burundi.

Location
From Butare, the power line continues south to the international border with Burundi. It crosses the border and continues to the  town of Ngozi, a road distance of approximately   

Overview
This power transmission line connects the electricity grid of Rwanda to that of neighboring Burundi. It is in line with the Nile Equatorial Lakes Subsidiary Action Program, Interconnection of Electric Grids Project, led by Regional Manager, Grania Rubomboras. The power line is being developed to facilitate exchange of electricity between the two neighboring countries and to be ready to buy electricity from other countries in the Eastern Africa Power Pool (EAPP), who have surplus power to sell. The countries with surplus power in the EAPP include Ethiopia, Kenya and Uganda.

Construction in Burundi
Construction in Burundi was launched in August 2020. The engineering, procurement and construction (EPC) contract was awarded to a consortium comprising Transrail Lighting from India and Hanbaek  from South Korea. The Burundi portion of this power transmission line is funded by loans to the government of Burundi, provided by the African Development Bank and the European Union.

Construction in Rwanda
In 2018, it was reported that KfW was going to fund the Rwanda portion of this power line. In 2022, online media reported that the entire line in both countries would be funded by the African Development Bank and the European Union.

Other consideration
The power line is designed in a fashion that allows it to operate at either 110kV or 220kV, if and when the need arises. Work involves the construction of new substations at Kigoma and Gitega, as well as connecting both ends of the transmission power line to control centers in Kigali, Rwanda for the northern end and Bujumbura, Burundi for the southern end.

See also
Energy in Burundi
Energy in Rwanda

References

External links
   Project Page at REG Website

High-voltage transmission lines in Burundi
High-voltage transmission lines in Rwanda
Energy infrastructure in Africa
Energy in Burundi
Energy in Rwanda